Qiandao Lake, a human-made, freshwater lake located in Chun'an County, Hangzhou, Zhejiang Province, China, was formed after the completion of the Xin'an River hydroelectric station in 1959.

Geography
1,078 large islands dot the lake and a few thousand smaller ones are scattered across it. Over 90% of the land area is forested. The islands in the lake include Bird Island, Snake Island, Monkey Island, Lock Island (featuring supposedly the world's biggest lock), and the Island to Remind You of Your Childhood.

The trend of Qiandao Lake's transformation from mid mesotrophic to mesotrophic, the polluting elements are heavy metals, nitrogen, phosphorus and organic matter, cages and cruise ships; (up to 10 meters underwater) the temperature changes greatly, with an average of 28.2 ℃-24.4 ℃, and the water temperature is mostly maintained at a relatively high temperature, called the warm water layer, which is greatly affected by floods. About 30 meters up and down there is a sudden change of water temperature. This layer can also be called thermocline. 

Spanning an area that nearly matches the size of Singapore and renown for having clear waters, Qiandao Lake hosts a major fishery and aquaculture industry. There are 83 species of fish in 13 families, including bighead carp, silver carp, grass carp, as well as precious fish species such as tuna, mandarin fish, and eel, with an annual output of more than 3,000 tons. It has also developed an artificial breeding industry, that mainly breeds carp, bream and tilapia, with an annual output of nearly 900,000 tons.

Due to its still waters, the lake is stocked with 30,000 sturgeons, a species that is native to Russia and Central Asia, which are bred to produce caviar for the Kaluga Queen label. The stillness of the waters helps the sturgeons to not have to swim against water currents and consequently be fattier, which allows its roe to be tastier and richer.

History

Xin'an River Dam
The valley was flooded in 1959 to create the lake for the Xin'an River Dam project.

Submerged city of Shicheng 

Submerged in the lake, at the foot of Wushi Mountain (五狮山, "Five Lion Mountain"), lies an ancient city known as Shicheng (狮城, "Lion City"), and was the county seat of the defunct Sui'an County (遂安县), which was merged into Chun'an County due to the construction of Qiandao Lake. It was built during the Eastern Han Dynasty (AD 25–200) and was first set up as a county in AD 208. The city acquired its name from nearby Wushi (Five Lion) Mountain, which is now known as Wushi Island since it too became partially submerged by the reservoir.

Besides the city of Shi Cheng many other historic sites have been confirmed beneath the water.

Qiandao Lake incident
In 1994, in an event since named the Qiandao Lake Incident, three hijackers boarded a boat full of tourists and set it on fire, killing all 32 passengers on board. The passengers were mainly tourists from Taiwan.

Archimedes bridge
In 1998, a Chinese-Italian consortium began planning the construction of a prototype of a submerged floating tunnel (also known as an Archimedes bridge), and decided in 2005 to build it across Qiandao Lake. The bridge, the first in the world of its kind, is expected to span , as a proof of concept for larger bridges.

Economy
Companies take advantage of the pristine quality of the water and environment for aquaculture and water branding. Qiandao Lake is used to produce the Nongfu Spring brand of mineral water. Kaluga Queen produces much of the world's caviar through raising sturgeon in pens at the lake.

The lake has made Zhejiang a popular area for tourists. As a result, housing development has increased in the area since the late 1990s.

Transport
An expressway links Hangzhou, Qiandao Lake, and Huangshan in Anhui. Every half an hour buses leave from West Hangzhou bus station to that connect Qiandao Lake.

On December 25, 2018, high speed rail services started to serve the Qiandaohu railway station on the Hangzhou-Huangshan intercity railway.

Gallery

See also 
 Lucky Buddha Beer
 Qiandao Lake Incident
 Hangzhou Qiandaohu, a company named after the lake, next to which its headquarters and brewery are located.

References

External links

Lakes of China
Tourist attractions in Zhejiang
Lakes of Zhejiang
Reservoirs in China
Chun'an County